William Gordon "Johnny" Grinnell (December 29, 1909 – June 26, 1997) was an American football player and coach. He played football at Tufts University from 1932 to 1934. He was the head football coach at Northeastern University from 1946 to 1947. Grinnell was elected to the College Football Hall of Fame in 1997.

Playing career 
Grinnell played end for the Tufts football team from 1932 to 1934. He was a protégé of legendary Tufts player Frederick "Fish" Ellis.

In 1934, Grinnell led Tufts to an 8–0 record. That year, Tufts ceded only one touchdown in eight games and cumulatively outscored its opponents by a margin of 91–9. On account of his high caliber of play, Grinnell was named to the first-ever Small College All-America team.

While at Tufts, Grinnell also played basketball, baseball, and track. He was a three-time member of the All-New England basketball team. Grinnell graduated from Tufts in 1935.

Coaching career 
Grinnell coached the Northeastern football team from 1946 to 1947, amassing a 4–8 record.

Death and legacy 
Grinnell died on June 26, 1997, due to congestive heart failure.

In August 1997, Grinnell became the first Tufts alumnus inducted into the College Football Hall of Fame. He was one of the first 13 non-Division I-A players admitted into the Hall of Fame.

On April 21, 2018, Grinnell was a member of the inaugural class inducted into the Tufts University Athletics Hall of Fame.

References

External links
 
 

1909 births
1997 deaths
American football ends
Basketball coaches from Massachusetts
Basketball players from Boston
College men's basketball head coaches in the United States
College men's track and field athletes in the United States
Northeastern Huskies football coaches
Northeastern Huskies men's basketball coaches
Tufts Jumbos baseball players
Tufts Jumbos football players
Tufts Jumbos men's basketball players
College Football Hall of Fame inductees
Sportspeople from Boston
American men's basketball players
Track and field athletes from Boston